Bayleys is a village in Saint Philip Parish in Barbados.

Populated places in Barbados
Saint Philip, Barbados